ACON Investments is an American international private equity investment company that administrates private equity funds as well as special purpose partnerships which invest in Latin America, United States and Europe. The organization was started in 1996, and is based in Washington D.C. It is responsible for administrating over US$5 billion worth of capital.  The company has facilities in District of Columbia, Mexico City, Los Angeles, Bogotá and São Paulo.

Subsidiaries 
 BioMatrix Specialty Pharmacy
 Igloo Products
 True Value
 Funko

References 

Financial services companies established in 1996
Investment companies of the United States